The 2014–15 season was Everton's 23rd season in the Premier League and 61st consecutive season in the top division of English football. It is also Everton's 116th season of league football and 118th season in all competitions. The club finished fifth in the previous campaign to qualify for the Europa League, which saw Everton play in Europe for the first time since the 2009–10 season. On 30 July 2014, the club signed Chelsea striker Romelu Lukaku for a club record £28 million.

Season overview

July

On 8 July, Everton signed Gareth Barry on a three-year contract after the midfielder had been on loan to the club in the previous campaign. Later in the month Bosnian Muhamed Bešić joined from Ferencváros for an undisclosed fee. On 30 July, Everton broke their record transfer fee by signing Romelu Lukaku from Chelsea for £28 million, smashing the £15 million the club paid for Marouane Fellaini in 2008. Lukaku had been on loan at Everton last season, scoring 16 goals in 33 games.

August
Everton played five pre-season friendlies before their first Premier League match without winning any (drew two, lost three). They opened the year with a 2–2 draw at newcomers Leicester City after twice being ahead. A week later goals from Séamus Coleman and Steven Naismith saw Everton take a 2–0 lead over Arsenal with seven minutes to go, but two late goals resulted in a second consecutive 2–2 draw. On 26 August, Everton signed Cameroon striker Samuel Eto'o on a free transfer. Everton were then involved in the joint seventh highest scoring game in the history of the Premier League when they fell 2–0 down at home to Chelsea after three minutes and went on to be defeated 6–3. It meant the club had equalled a Premier League record by conceding 10 goals in the first three games.

September
Everton recorded their first win of the campaign by beating West Bromwich Albion 2–0 at the Hawthorns with Lukaku getting his first goal since joining permanently. The club then returned to European football for the first time since February 2010 with an impressive 4–1 victory over VfL Wolfsburg. Everton's congested fixture list then seemed to affect results as Crystal Palace beat them 3–2 at Goodison Park for the second successive season and the Toffees were unceremoniously knocked out of the League Cup 3–0 by Swansea City. However, the month did end on a positive note when Phil Jagielka scored a spectacular injury-time drive from 30 yards to salvage a 1–1 in the first Merseyside derby at Anfield.

October
The side battled to a 1–1 draw once more this time in Russia against Krasnodar with Samuel Eto'o getting the goal. The fixture became Everton's furthest ever competitive game, some 2,400 miles from Goodison Park. A 2–1 loss at Old Trafford followed with Leighton Baines missing his first Premier League penalty after converting all of his 15 previous ones. During the match defender John Stones picked up an ankle injury which ruled him out of the rest of 2014, but in the next game Everton welcomed back Ross Barkley for his first appearance of the season and beat Aston Villa 3–0 at home. Everton won successive games for the first time this season by defeating Burnley 3–1 with Eto'o scoring a brace and on 31 October announced club record profits of £28.2 million for the year ending 31 May 2014.

November
A 0–0 draw with Swansea City marked the first time Everton had not scored a goal in a league match this season. They remained top of Group H in the Europa League with a resounding 3–0 win over Lille. Everton recorded just their second home win of the season by beating West Ham United 2–1 and then guaranteed they would finish atop of their Europa League group with a game to spare when they won 2–0 against Wolfsburg, described as a perfect away performance by Martínez. However, the month closed with a first defeat in eight games in all competitions when they lost 2–1 to Tottenham Hotspur.

December
Martínez then blamed Everton's busy schedule of matches for their 1–1 home draw against relegation candidates Hull City and a contentious penalty for Manchester City proved the difference in a 1–0 loss at the City of Manchester Stadium. Ross Barkley scored a superb individual goal to put Everton 1–0 ahead of Queens Park Rangers, with further goals from Kevin Mirallas and Steven Naismith helping the Toffees to their fifth league win of the campaign. Everton's up and down season continued when they were beaten 3–0 by Southampton to maintain their mid-table position in the league. However, their form was to get worse over the Christmas period with a 1–0 home defeat to Stoke City and a 3–2 loss against Newcastle United. Everton ended the calendar year with the second worse defensive record in the league and had made the most individual errors resulting in goals in Europe's top five leagues. Despite this, Martínez stated that he would not change his team's style of play which had proven so successful last season.

January
Everton lost their fourth game in a row on New Year's Day when Hull City saw them off 2–0. Lukaku scored a stoppage time goal to rescue a 1–1 draw against West Ham United in the third round of the FA Cup. Their run without picking up any points ended when Steven Naismith equalised to draw 1–1 at home to reigning champions Manchester City. Leighton Baines delivered the ball for the goal which was his 45th assist in the Premier League to overtake Graeme Le Saux as the defender with the most in the history of the division. Aiden McGeady was sent off in the 56th minute of Everton's FA Cup replay with West Ham, but Kevin Mirallas scored a free kick to send the match into extra time during which Everton took the lead through Lukaku. However, West Ham levelled meaning penalties were required to settle the tie which they won 9–8 after goalkeeper Joel Robles missed for Everton and his opposite number Adrián converted the game-winning penalty.
The barren spell continued with a 0–0 draw at home to West Bromwich Albion after Kevin Mirallas refused to hand over the ball to regular penalty taker Leighton Baines and subsequently missed. Samuel Eto'o's brief stay at the club ended when he joined Sampdoria.

February
Everton won for the first time in nine matches as Lukaku scored the only goal of the game after two minutes in beating Crystal Palace. The club signed Aaron Lennon from Tottenham Hotspur on loan for the rest of the season on transfer deadline day. A 0–0 draw with Liverpool followed before an 89th minute Chelsea goal proved the difference between the teams. However, Everton's good form in Europe continued as Lukaku scored a hat-trick during a 4–1 away win over Swiss side Young Boys, despite playing for over half an hour with 10 men after John Stones had been dismissed. Bottom of the table club Leicester City twice came from behind to draw 2–2 in the next league fixture, but Everton closed out the month by comfortably progressing to the last 16 of the Europa League by seeing off Young Boys 7–2 on aggregate.

March

Everton's struggles in the league continued as they lost back-to-back matches 2–0 against Arsenal and Stoke City which led Martínez to admit for the first time that his side were in a relegation battle. With 28 points from 28 games, it was Everton's lowest tally at this stage of a season in the history of the Premier League. They responded by coming from a goal down to take a 2–1 first leg lead over Dynamo Kyiv. Lukaku became the club's record European goal scorer as he netted for the seventh time in the competition this season. Everton then won their first league game at home in over three months as James McCarthy opened the scoring with his first goal of the year against Newcastle United and further strikes from Lukaku and Ross Barkley completed a 3–0 victory. The Toffees' run in Europe ended on a 6–4 aggregate loss to Dynamo when they lost the second leg 5–2. For the first time since October, Everton won two consecutive league games with a 2–1 success against Queens Park Rangers which put them nine points clear of relegation.

April
A 1–0 win over Southampton made for Everton's first three-game league win streak of the season. Everton then tied 1–1 with Swansea City after a goal from Aaron Lennon opened the scoring, and a Jonjo Shelvey penalty equalised for Swansea. Everton defeated relegation candidates Burnley 1–0, before producing undoubtedly their best performance of the season in beating Manchester United 3–0. It marked the third season in a row that Everton had won the home fixture versus the Red Devils and extended their unbeaten run to six matches.

May
Despite Everton's late season revival, May has so far proved something of an anti-climax as the club were beaten 3–2 by Aston Villa and suffered their first home defeat since December, 2–0 against Sunderland. However, a goal from Leon Osman, coupled with Romelu Lukaku's injury time winner against West Ham ended the Toffee's two game losing streak as well as ensuring Everton would defeat the Hammers for a third consecutive season in Upton Park. Having said that, the mediocre season was capped off with a 1–0 defeat at the hands of Tottenham Hotspur with Harry Kane scoring the only goal. The game similarly marked the end of Sylvain Distin's distinguished Everton career.

Players

Squad information

Player awards 
 Player of the Season – Phil Jagielka
 Players' Player of the Season – Phil Jagielka
 Young Player of the Season – John Stones
 Reserve / U21 Player of the Season – Brendan Galloway
 Academy Player of the Season – Harry Charsley
 Goal of the Season – Phil Jagielka vs. Liverpool

Pre-season and Friendlies 

Last updated: 9 August 2014Source: Everton F.C.

Competitions

Overall

Overview

Premier League

League table

Results summary

Results by matchday

Matches

The fixtures for the 2014–15 season were announced on 18 June 2014 at 9am.

Last updated: match played 24 May 2015.Source: Everton F.C.

FA Cup 

Last updated: 13 January 2015Source: Everton F.C.

League Cup 

Last updated: 23 September 2014Source: Everton F.C.

UEFA Europa League

Group stage

Round of 32

Round of 16

Statistics

Appearances

|}

Goalscorers

{| class="wikitable" style="text-align:center;"
|-
!width:35px;"|
!width:35px;"|
!width:35px;"|
!width:200px;"|Player
!width:75px;"|Premier League
!width:75px;"|Europa League
!width:75px;"|FA Cup
!width:75px;"|League Cup
!width:75px;"|Total
|-
|1 || FW || 10 || align=left|  || 10 || 8 || 2 || 0 || 20
|-
|2 || FW || 11 || align=left|  || 7 || 3 || 1 || 0 || 11
|-
|3 || FW || 14 || align=left|  || 6 || 2 || 0 || 0 || 8
|-
|4 || DF || 6 || align=left|  || 4 || 2 || 0 || 0 || 6
|-
|5 || DF || 23 || align=left|  || 3 || 2 || 0 || 0 || 5
|-
| 6 || FW || 5 || align=left|  || 3 || 1 || 0 || 0 || 4
|-
| rowspan=2|7  || DF || 3 || align=left|  || 2 || 1 || 0 || 0 || 3
|-
| MF || 21 || align=left|  || 2 || 1 || 0 || 0 || 3
|-
| rowspan=3|9 || MF || 20 || align=left|  || 2 || 0 || 0 || 0 || 2
|-
| MF || 25 || align=left|  || 2 || 0 || 0 || 0 || 2
|-
| MF || 16 || align=left|  || 2 || 0 || 0 || 0 || 2
|-
| rowspan=3|12 || FW || 9 || align=left|  || 1 || 0 || 0 || 0 || 1
|-
| MF || 7 || align=left|  || 1 || 0 || 0 || 0 || 1
|-
| DF || 26 || align=left|  || 1 || 0 || 0 || 0 || 1
|-
|# ||colspan="3"|Own Goals || 2 || 1 || 0 || 0 || 3
|-
!colspan="4"|Total || 48 || 21 || 3 || 0 || 72
|-

Disciplinary record
{| class="wikitable" style="text-align: center; width: 50%"
|-
! rowspan="2" width=35px |
! rowspan="2" width=200px |Name
! colspan="3" width=78px |Premier League
! colspan="3" width=78px |FA Cup
! colspan="3" width=78px |League Cup
! colspan="3" width=78px |Europa League
! colspan="3" width=78px |Total
|-
!  style="width:25px; background:#fe9;"|
!  style="width:28px; background:#ff8888;"|
!  style="width:25px; background:#ff8888;"|
!  style="width:25px; background:#fe9;"|
!  style="width:28px; background:#ff8888;"|
!  style="width:25px; background:#ff8888;"|
!  style="width:25px; background:#fe9;"|
!  style="width:28px; background:#ff8888;"|
!  style="width:25px; background:#ff8888;"|
!  style="width:25px; background:#fe9;"|
!  style="width:28px; background:#ff8888;"|
!  style="width:25px; background:#ff8888;"|
!  style="width:25px; background:#fe9;"|
!  style="width:28px; background:#ff8888;"|
!  style="width:25px; background:#ff8888;"|
|-
|1
|align=left| Gareth Barry
|10
|1
|0
|1
|0
|0
|0
|0
|0
|1
|0
|0
|12
|1
|0
|-
|2
|align=left|
|8
|0
|0
|0
|0
|0
|0
|0
|0
|3
|0
|0
|11
|0
|0
|-
|3
|align=left| Steven Naismith
|8
|0
|0
|0
|0
|0
|0
|0
|0
|2
|0
|0
|10
|0
|0
|-
|4
|align=left| James McCarthy
|7
|0
|0
|0
|0
|0
|0
|0
|0
|0
|0
|0
|7
|0
|0
|-
|5
|align=left| Kevin Mirallas
|3
|0
|0
|1
|0
|0
|0
|0
|0
|2
|0
|0
|6
|0
|0
|-
| rowspan=2|6
|align=left| Séamus Coleman
|5
|0
|0
|0
|0
|0
|0
|0
|0
|0
|0
|0
|5
|0
|0
|-
|align=left| Romelu Lukaku
|1
|0
|0
|1
|0
|0
|0
|0
|0
|3
|0
|0
|5
|0
|0
|-
| rowspan=4|8
|align=left| Antolín Alcaraz
|1
|1
|0
|0
|0
|0
|0
|0
|0
|0
|0
|0
|1
|1
|0
|-
|align=left| Leighton Baines
|4
|0
|0
|0
|0
|0
|0
|0
|0
|0
|0
|0
|4
|0
|0
|-
|align=left| Aiden McGeady
|1
|0
|0
|0
|1
|0
|0
|0
|0
|0
|0
|0
|1
|1
|0
|-
|align=left| John Stones
|1
|0
|0
|0
|0
|0
|0
|0
|0
|0
|0
|1
|1
|0
|1
|-
| rowspan=4|12
|align=left| Tim Howard
|3
|0
|0
|0
|0
|0
|0
|0
|0
|0
|0
|0
|3
|0
|0
|-
|align=left| Arouna Koné
|2
|0
|0
|0
|0
|0
|0
|0
|0
|1
|0
|0
|3
|0
|0
|-
|align=left| Bryan Oviedo
|3
|0
|0
|0
|0
|0
|0
|0
|0
|0
|0
|0
|3
|0
|0
|-
|align=left| Steven Pienaar
|1
|0
|0
|0
|0
|0
|0
|0
|0
|2
|0
|0
|3
|0
|0
|-
| rowspan=5|16
|align=left| Ross Barkley
|1
|0
|0
|0
|0
|0
|0
|0
|0
|1
|0
|0
|2
|0
|0
|-
|align=left| Samuel Eto'o
|1
|0
|0
|1
|0
|0
|0
|0
|0
|0
|0
|0
|2
|0
|0
|-
|align=left| Luke Garbutt
|1
|0
|0
|0
|0
|0
|1
|0
|0
|0
|0
|0
|2
|0
|0
|-
|align=left| Aaron Lennon
|2
|0
|0
|0
|0
|0
|0
|0
|0
|0
|0
|0
|2
|0
|0
|-
|align=left| Joel Robles
|1
|0
|0
|1
|0
|0
|0
|0
|0
|0
|0
|0
|2
|0
|0
|-
| rowspan=2|21
|align=left| Brendan Galloway
|1
|0
|0
|0
|0
|0
|0
|0
|0
|0
|0
|0
|1
|0
|0
|-
|align=left| Phil Jagielka
|1
|0
|0
|0
|0
|0
|0
|0
|0
|0
|0
|0
|1
|0
|0
|-
!colspan=2|Total
! 63 !! 2 !! 0 !! 5 !! 1 !! 0 !! 1 !! 0 !! 0 !! 15 !! 0 !! 1 !! 84 !! 3 !! 1

Home attendances

Correct as of match played 24 May 2015.

{| class="wikitable sortable" style="text-align:center; font-size:90%"
|-
!width=100 | Comp
!width=120 | Date
!width=60 | Score
!width=250 class="unsortable" | Opponent
!width=150 | Attendance
|-
|Premier League||23 August 2014 ||bgcolor="#FFFFCC"|2–2 ||Arsenal ||39,490
|-
|Premier League||30 August 2014 ||bgcolor="#FFCCCC"|3–6 ||Chelsea ||39,402
|-
|Premier League||21 September 2014 ||bgcolor="#FFCCCC"|2–3 ||Crystal Palace ||37,574
|-
|Premier League||18 October 2014 ||bgcolor="#CCFFCC"|3–0 ||Aston Vila ||39,505
|-
|Premier League||1 November 2014 ||bgcolor="#FFFFCC"|0–0 ||Swansea City ||39,149
|-
|Premier League||22 November 2014 ||bgcolor="#CCFFCC"|2–1 ||West Ham United ||39,182
|-
|Premier League||3 December 2014 ||bgcolor="#FFFFCC"|1–1 ||Hull City ||34,645
|-
|Premier League||15 December 2014 ||bgcolor="#CCFFCC"|3–1 ||Queens Park Rangers ||34,035
|-
|Premier League||26 December 2014 ||bgcolor="#FFCCCC"|0–1 ||Stoke City ||39,166
|-
|FA Cup||6 January 2015 ||bgcolor="#FFFFCC"|1–1 ||West Ham United ||22,236
|-
|Premier League||10 January 2015 ||bgcolor="#FFFFCC"|1–1 ||Manchester City ||39,499
|-
|Premier League||19 January 2015 ||bgcolor="#FFFFCC"|0–0 ||West Bromwich Albion ||34,739
|-
|Premier League||7 February 2015 ||bgcolor="#FFFFCC"|0–0 ||Liverpool ||39,621
|-
|Premier League||22 February 2015 ||bgcolor="#FFFFCC"|2–2 ||Leicester City ||38,904
|-
|Premier League||15 March 2015 ||bgcolor="#CCFFCC"|3–0 ||Newcastle United ||38,806
|-
|Premier League||4 April 2015 ||bgcolor="#CCFFCC"|1–0 ||Southampton ||39,390
|-
|Premier League||18 April 2015 ||bgcolor="#CCFFCC"|1–0 ||Burnley ||39,496
|-
|Premier League||26 April 2015 ||bgcolor="#CCFFCC"|3–0 ||Manchester United ||39,497
|-
|Premier League||9 May 2015 ||bgcolor="#FFCCCC"|0–2 ||Sunderland ||38,246
|-
|Premier League||24 May 2015 ||bgcolor="#FFCCCC"|0–1 ||Tottenham Hotspur ||39,365
|-
|bgcolor="#C0C0C0"|
|bgcolor="#C0C0C0"|
|bgcolor="#C0C0C0"|
| Total attendance
|751,947
|-
|bgcolor="#C0C0C0"|
|bgcolor="#C0C0C0"|
|bgcolor="#C0C0C0"|
| Total league attendance
|729,711
|-
|bgcolor="#C0C0C0"|
|bgcolor="#C0C0C0"|
|bgcolor="#C0C0C0"|
| Average attendance
|37,597
|-
|bgcolor="#C0C0C0"|
|bgcolor="#C0C0C0"|
|bgcolor="#C0C0C0"|
| Average league attendance
|38,406

Transfers

In

Out

Loans in

Loans out

References 

Everton F.C. seasons
Everton
Everton